The Woodruff County Courthouse is a historic courthouse at 500 North 3rd Street in Augusta, the county seat of Woodruff County, Arkansas.  It is a monumental brick Romanesque Revival building, designed by the noted Arkansas architect Charles L. Thompson and built in 1900.  It is roughly rectangular with a hip roof, but has projecting sections as well as a five-stage tower, capped by a pyramidal roof.  Its main entrance is to the left of the tower, recessed in a round-arch opening.

The building was listed on the National Register of Historic Places in 1982.

Gallery

See also
 
 
National Register of Historic Places listings in Woodruff County, Arkansas

References

County courthouses in Arkansas
Courthouses on the National Register of Historic Places in Arkansas
Romanesque Revival architecture in Arkansas
National Register of Historic Places in Woodruff County, Arkansas
Richardsonian Romanesque architecture in the United States
1900 establishments in Arkansas
Government buildings completed in 1900
Augusta, Arkansas